Clubul Sportiv Știința Miroslava, commonly known as Știința Miroslava or simply as Miroslava, is a football club from Romania, based in Miroslava, Iași County and founded in 2009 the club is currently playing in the Liga III.

History

Știința Miroslava was founded at the initiative of the mayor of Miroslava, Dan Niță in 2009. At the end of 2011–12 season of Liga IV Iași County they finished second again like the past season but this time they promoted for the first time in Liga III. In the 2014–15 season of Liga III they almost promoted to the Liga II but they just achieved the second place.

2015-16 Liga III season was again a very good one for the team from Iași County which finished 3rd.

2016-17 Liga III season was a very tough in Seria I of the Liga III and with only one round remaining FK Miercurea Ciuc led the championship with 63 points, followed by AFC Hărman with 62 points and Știința with 61. Știința played away in Miercurea Ciuc and won 1–0, but they also needed AFC Hărman not to win against CSM Pașcani another team from Iași County, but from the bottom of the table. AFC Hărman led by 1–0 until the 90+1 minute when Jan Turiță, CSM Pașcani's goalkeeper, scored for 1–1 and promoting Miroslava to Liga II for the first time in the short history of the club.

Honours
Liga III:
Winners (1): 2016–17
Runners-up (1): 2014–15
Liga IV – Iași County:
Runners-up (2): 2010–11, 2011–12

Players

First team squad

Out on loan

Club officials

Board of directors

Current technical staff

League history

References

External links
Official website

 
Association football clubs established in 2009
Football clubs in Iași County
Liga II clubs
Liga III clubs
Liga IV clubs
2009 establishments in Romania